Plant perception is the ability of plants to sense and respond to the environment by adjusting their morphology and physiology. Botanical research has revealed that plants are capable of reacting to a broad range of stimuli, including chemicals, gravity, light, moisture, infections, temperature, oxygen and carbon dioxide concentrations, parasite infestation, disease, physical disruption, sound, and touch. The scientific study of plant perception is informed by numerous disciplines, such as plant physiology, ecology, and molecular biology.

Aspects of perception

Light

Many plant organs contain photoreceptors (phototropins, cryptochromes, and phytochromes), each of which reacts very specifically to certain wavelengths of light. These light sensors tell the plant if it is day or night, how long the day is, how much light is available, and where the light is coming from. Shoots generally grow towards light, while roots grow away from it, responses known as phototropism and skototropism, respectively. They are brought about by light-sensitive pigments like phototropins and phytochromes and the plant hormone auxin.

Many plants exhibit certain behaviors at specific times of the day; for example, flowers that open only in the mornings. Plants keep track of the time of day with a circadian clock. This internal clock is synchronized with solar time every day using sunlight, temperature, and other cues, similar to the biological clocks present in other organisms. The internal clock coupled with the ability to perceive light also allows plants to measure the time of the day and so determine the season of the year. This is how many plants know when to flower (see photoperiodism). The seeds of many plants sprout only after they are exposed to light. This response is carried out by phytochrome signalling. Plants are also able to sense the quality of light and respond appropriately. For example, in low light conditions, plants produce more photosynthetic pigments. If the light is very bright or if the levels of harmful ultraviolet radiation increase, plants produce more of their protective pigments that act as sunscreens.

Gravity

To orient themselves correctly, plants must be able to sense the direction of gravity. The subsequent response is known as gravitropism.

In roots, gravity is sensed and translated in the root tip, which then grows by elongating in the direction of gravity. In shoots, growth occurs in the opposite direction, a phenomenon known as negative gravitropism. Poplar stems can detect reorientation and inclination (equilibrioception) through gravitropism.

At the root tip, amyloplasts containing starch granules fall in the direction of gravity. This weight activates secondary receptors, which signal to the plant the direction of the gravitational pull. After this occurs, auxin is redistributed through polar auxin transport and differential growth towards gravity begins. In the shoots, auxin redistribution occurs in a way to produce differential growth away from gravity.

For perception to occur, the plant often must be able to sense, perceive, and translate the direction of gravity. Without gravity, proper orientation will not occur and the plant will not effectively grow. The root will not be able to uptake nutrients or water, and the shoot will not grow towards the sky to maximize photosynthesis.

Touch 

All plants are able to sense touch. Thigmotropism is directional movement that occurs in plants responding to physical touch. Climbing plants, such as tomatoes, exhibit thigmotropism, allowing them to curl around objects. These responses are generally slow (on the order of multiple hours), and can best be observed with time-lapse cinematography, but rapid movements can occur as well. For example, the so-called "sensitive plant" (Mimosa pudica) responds to even the slightest physical touch by quickly folding its thin pinnate leaves such that they point downwards, and carnivorous plants such as the Venus flytrap (Dionaea muscipula) produce specialized leaf structures that snap shut when touched or landed upon by insects. In the Venus flytrap, touch is detected by cilia lining the inside of the specialized leaves, which generate an action potential that stimulates motor cells and causes movement to occur.

Smell
Wounded or infected plants produce distinctive volatile odors, (e.g. methyl jasmonate, methyl salicylate, green leaf volatiles), which can in turn be perceived by neighboring plants. Plants detecting these sorts of volatile signals often respond by increasing their chemical defences and/or prepare for attack by producing chemicals which defend against insects or attract insect predators.

Vibration 
Plants upregulate chemical defenses such as glucosinolate and anthocyanin in response to vibrations created during herbivory.

Signal transduction

Plant hormones and chemical signals 

Plants systematically use hormonal signalling pathways to coordinate their development and morphology.

Plants produce several signal molecules usually associated with animal nervous systems, such as glutamate, GABA, acetylcholine, melatonin, and serotonin. They may also use ATP, NO, and ROS for signaling in similar ways as animals do.

Electrophysiology 

Plants have a variety of methods of delivering electrical signals. The four commonly recognized propagation methods include action potentials (APs), variation potentials (VPs), local electric potentials (LEPs), and systemic potentials (SPs)

Although plant cells are not neurons, they can be electrically excitable and can display rapid electrical responses in the form of APs to environmental stimuli. APs allow for the movement of signaling ions and molecules from the pre-potential cell to the post-potential cell(s). These electrophysiological signals are constituted by gradient fluxes of ions such as H+, K+, Cl−, Na+, and Ca2+ but it is also thought that other electrically charge ions such as Fe3+, Al3+, Mg2+, Zn2+, Mn2+, and Hg2+ may also play a role in downstream outputs. The maintenance of each ions electrochemical gradient is vital in the health of the cell in that if the cell would ever reach equilibrium with its environment, it is dead. This dead state can be due to a variety of reasons such as ion channel blocking or membrane puncturing.

These electrophysiological ions bind to receptors on the receiving cell causing downstream effects result from one or a combination of molecules present. This means of transferring information and activating physiological responses via a signaling molecule system has been found to be faster and more frequent in the presence of APs.

These action potentials can influence processes such as actin-based cytoplasmic streaming, plant organ movements, wound responses, respiration, photosynthesis, and flowering. These electrical responses can cause the synthesis of numerous organic molecules, including ones that act as neuroactive substances in other organisms such as calcium ions.

The ion flux across cells also influence the movement of other molecules and solutes. This changes the osmotic gradient of the cell, resulting in changes to turgor pressure in plant cells by water and solute flux across cell membranes. These variations are vital for nutrient uptake, growth, many types of movements (tropisms and nastic movements) among other basic plant physiology and behavior. (Higinbotham 1973; Scott 2008; Segal 2016).

Thus, plants achieve behavioural responses in environmental, communicative, and ecological contexts.

Signal perception

Plant behavior is mediated by phytochromes, kinins, hormones, antibiotic or other chemical release, changes of water and chemical transport, and other means.

Plants have many strategies to fight off pests. For example, they can produce a slew of different chemical toxins against predators and parasites or they can induce rapid cell death to prevent the spread of infectious agents. Plants can also respond to volatile signals produced by other plants. Jasmonate levels also increase rapidly in response to mechanical perturbations such as tendril coiling.

In plants, the mechanism responsible for adaptation is signal transduction. Adaptive responses include:
Active foraging for light and nutrients. They do this by changing their architecture, e.g. branch growth and direction, physiology, and phenotype.
Leaves and branches being positioned and oriented in response to a light source.
Detecting soil volume and adapting growth accordingly, independently of nutrient availability.
Defending against herbivores.

Plant intelligence

Plants do not have brains or neuronal networks like animals do; however, reactions within signalling pathways may provide a biochemical basis for learning and memory in addition to computation and basic problem solving. 

Controversially, the brain is used as a metaphor by some plant perception researchers to provide an integrated view of signalling.

Plants respond to environmental stimuli by movement and changes in morphology. They communicate while actively competing for resources. In addition, plants accurately compute their circumstances, use sophisticated cost–benefit analysis, and take tightly controlled actions to mitigate and control diverse environmental stressors. Plants are also capable of discriminating between positive and negative experiences and of learning by registering memories from their past experiences. Plants use this information to adapt their behaviour in order to survive present and future challenges of their environments.

Plant physiology studies the role of signalling to integrate data obtained at the genetic, biochemical, cellular, and physiological levels, in order to understand plant development and behaviour. The neurobiological view sees plants as information-processing organisms with rather complex processes of communication occurring throughout the individual plant. It studies how environmental information is gathered, processed, integrated, and shared (sensory plant biology) to enable these adaptive and coordinated responses (plant behaviour); and how sensory perceptions and behavioural events are 'remembered' in order to allow predictions of future activities upon the basis of past experiences. Plants, it is claimed by some plant physiologists, are as sophisticated in behaviour as animals, but this sophistication has been masked by the time scales of plants' responses to stimuli, which are typically many orders of magnitude slower than those of animals.

It has been argued that although plants are capable of adaptation, it should not be called intelligence per se, as plant neurobiologists rely primarily on metaphors and analogies to argue that complex responses in plants can only be produced by intelligence. "A bacterium can monitor its environment and instigate developmental processes appropriate to the prevailing circumstances, but is that intelligence? Such simple adaptation behaviour might be bacterial intelligence but is clearly not animal intelligence." However, plant intelligence fits a definition of intelligence proposed by David Stenhouse in a book about evolution and animal intelligence, in which he describes it as "adaptively variable behaviour during the lifetime of the individual". Critics of the concept have also argued that a plant cannot have goals once it is past the developmental stage of seedling because, as a modular organism, each module seeks its own survival goals and the resulting organism-level behavior is not centrally controlled. This view, however, necessarily accommodates the possibility that a tree is a collection of individually intelligent modules cooperating, competing, and influencing each other to determine behavior in a bottom-up fashion. The development into a larger organism whose modules must deal with different environmental conditions and challenges is not universal across plant species, however, as smaller organisms might be subject to the same conditions across their bodies, at least, when the below and aboveground parts are considered separately. Moreover, the claim that central control of development is completely absent from plants is readily falsified by apical dominance.

The Italian botanist Federico Delpino wrote on the idea of plant intelligence in 1867. Charles Darwin studied movement in plants and in 1880 published a book, The Power of Movement in Plants. Darwin concludes:
It is hardly an exaggeration to say that the tip of the radicle thus endowed [..] acts like the brain of one of the lower animals; the brain being situated within the anterior end of the body, receiving impressions from the sense-organs, and directing the several movements.In 2020, Paco Calvo studied the dynamic of plant movements and investigated whether French beans deliberately aim for supporting structures. Calvo said: “We see these signatures of complex behaviour, the one and only difference being is that it’s not neural-based, as it is in humans. This isn’t just adaptive behaviour, it’s anticipatory, goal-directed, flexible behaviour.”

In philosophy, there are few studies of the implications of plant perception. Michael Marder put forth a phenomenology of plant life based on the physiology of plant perception. Paco Calvo Garzon offers a philosophical take on plant perception based on the cognitive sciences and the computational modeling of consciousness.

Comparison with neurobiology

Plant sensory and response systems have been compared to the neurobiological processes of animals. Plant neurobiology concerns mostly the sensory adaptive behaviour of plants and plant electrophysiology. Indian scientist J. C. Bose is credited as the first person to research and talk about the neurobiology of plants. Many plant scientists and neuroscientists, however, view the term "plant neurobiology" as a misnomer, because plants do not have neurons.

The ideas behind plant neurobiology were criticised in a 2007 article published in Trends in Plant Science by Amedeo Alpi and 35 other scientists, including such eminent plant biologists as Gerd Jürgens, Ben Scheres, and Chris Sommerville. The breadth of fields of plant science represented by these researchers reflects the fact that the vast majority of the plant science research community rejects plant neurobiology as a legitimate notion. Their main arguments are that:
"Plant neurobiology does not add to our understanding of plant physiology, plant cell biology or signaling".
"There is no evidence for structures such as neurons, synapses or a brain in plants".
The common occurrence of plasmodesmata in plants "poses a problem for signaling from an electrophysiological point of view", since extensive electrical coupling would preclude the need for any cell-to-cell transport of ‘neurotransmitter-like' compounds.

The authors call for an end to "superficial analogies and questionable extrapolations" if the concept of "plant neurobiology" is to benefit the research community. Several responses to this criticism have attempted to clarify that the term "plant neurobiology" is a metaphor and that metaphors have proved useful on previous occasions. Plant ecophysiology describes this phenomenon.

Parallels in other taxa

The concepts of plant perception, communication, and intelligence have parallels in other biological organisms for which such phenomena appear foreign to or incompatible with traditional understandings of biology, or have otherwise proven difficult to study or interpret. Similar mechanisms exist in bacterial cells, choanoflagellates, fungal hyphae, and sponges, among many other examples. All of these organisms, despite being devoid of a brain or nervous system, are capable of sensing their immediate and momentary environment and responding accordingly. In the case of unicellular life, the sensory pathways are even more primitive in the sense that they take place on the surface of a single cell, as opposed to within a network of many related cells.

See also

Auxin
Biosemiotics
Chemotropism
Ethylene
Gravitropism
Heliotropism
Hydrotropism
Hypersensitive response
Kairomone
Kinesis (biology)
Nastic movements
Phytosemiotics
Plant cognition
Plant defense against herbivory
Plant evolutionary developmental biology
Plant perception (paranormal)
Plant tolerance to herbivory
Rapid plant movement
The Secret Life of Plants
Statocyte
Stoma
Systemic acquired resistance
Taxis
Thermotropism
Tropism

References

Further reading

Baluška F (ed) (2009). Plant-Environment Interactions: From Sensory Plant Biology to Active Plant Behavior. Springer Verlag.

Gilroy S, Masson PH (2007). Plant Tropisms. Iowa State University Press.

Karban R (2015). Plant Sensing and Communication. University of Chicago Press.
Mancuso S, Shabala S (2006). Rhythms in Plants. Springer Verlag.

Scott P (2008). Physiology and Behaviour of Plants. John Wiley & Sons Ltd.

Volkov AG (2006). Plant Electrophysiology. Springer Verlag.

External links
Plant Signaling and Behavior Scientific journal for Plant Neurobiology
Plants cannot "think and remember," but there's nothing stupid about them: They're shockingly sophisticated
How Does a Venus Flytrap Work?

	

Plant physiology
Plant cognition
Plant ecology